Rosalie Williams (12 June 1919 in Barton upon Irwell, Lancashire – 11 December 2009 in Manchester) was an English actress best known for her appearance as Mrs. Hudson in The Adventures of Sherlock Holmes TV series produced by Granada Television from 1984 until 1994 alongside Jeremy Brett, David Burke, Edward Hardwicke, and Colin Jeavons.

Rosalie Williams also appeared as Mrs Lacey, Mrs Rimmer and Mrs Sowerbutts  in Coronation Street, an award-winning British soap opera (March 1978 to 1991), and as Mary in 10 episodes of Flambards (1979).

Her first husband was Hugh Sinclair, with whom she had two children.
Her second husband, actor David Scase, died in 2003. Their son, Rory, was also in the theatre business.

Credits
Williams has the following credits to her name:
 The Memoirs of Sherlock Holmes – Mrs Hudson (6 episodes; 1994)
 Dancing Queen (1993) (TV) – Lily
 The Casebook of Sherlock Holmes – Mrs Hudson (5 episodes; 1991–93)
 Truckers (1992) TV Series (voice) – Gran'ma Morkie/Baroness of Delicacy
 The Beiderbecke Connection (1988) TV mini-series – Miss Pringle
 Casualty – Mary Payton (1 episode; 1988)
 The Return of Sherlock Holmes – Mrs Hudson (7 episodes; 1986–88)
 The Adventures of Sherlock Holmes – Mrs Hudson (8 episodes; 1984–85)
 Coronation Street – Mrs Rimmer (3 episodes; 1978–1985)
 A Different Kind of Love (1985) – Dinner Guest
 How We Used To Live – Bessie (1 episode; 1984)
 The Outsider – Irene Jefford (1 episode, 1983)
 Juliet Bravo – Ann Lambert (2 episodes; 1981–83)
 ITV Playhouse – Mrs Foster (2 episodes; 1977–82)
 Hedda Gabler (1981) (TV) – Berthe
 The Sandbaggers – English Lady (1 episode; 1980)
 The Dick Francis Thriller: The Racing Game – Mrs. Dysart (1 episode; 1979)
 Flambards (1979) TV mini-series – Mary
 Crown Court (1 episode; 1973)
 Getting Away from It All (1972) (TV) – Rose Malone
 Open Window (1972) – Emily
 Paper Roses (1971) (TV) – Neighbour
 Softly Softly – Mrs Thomas (1 episode; 1968)
 Z-Cars – Mrs Pearson (1 episode; 1965)
 The Younger Generation – Mrs Sayers (1 episode; 1961)

References

External links
 
 Made a search at Ancestry.co.uk. "Mrs Rosalie Scase" can be found at the top of the list. Unfortunately you have to subscribe to get the full information.

1919 births
2009 deaths
British soap opera actresses
British television actresses
British film producers
20th-century British actresses